Adavi Ramudu  is a 1977 Indian Telugu-language action film produced by Satyanarayana and Suryanarayana under their banner of Satya Chitra. It was directed by K. Raghavendra Rao. The film stars N. T. Rama Rao, Jaya Prada and Jayasudha in lead roles along with Nagabhushanam, Satyanarayana, Gummadi and Jaggayya in other supporting roles. The film was based on Vijay's 1973 film Gandhada Gudi. The film focuses on the need to preserve the flora and fauna at a time when the CITES treaty was signed with an aim to reduce the economic incentive to poach endangered species.

The grand success of Gandhada Gudi made with a forest backdrop prompted NTR to work on a script and dialogues based on a forest backdrop. In 1973, when Satyanarayana and Suryanarayana were planning their next production venture Gandhada Gudi, went on to be a blockbuster hit in Karnataka prompted the team to suggest that Jandhyala should work on the script and dialogues based on a forest backdrop. They then approached Raghavendra Rao to work for them, whom they already knew as an assistant director as he just started taking up direction independently. Principal photography began in January 1977 and was shot extensivly in and around Madumalai forest. The film was edited by Kotagiri Venkateswara Rao and the music composed by K. V. Mahadevan, with the lyrics written by Veturi. The cinematography was done by A. Vincent.

The film was released on 28 April 1977 to positive reviews. The film was a commercial success, running for 366 days in theatres. This film won the Filmfare Best Film Award (Telugu). The film re-brought NTR in the league of top heroes of the Telugu film Industry. It was also a breakthrough for Raghavendra Rao and helped him establish himself in the industry. It was recorded an all time blockbuster and was the highest grossing Telugu film of the 1970s until its record was broken by the 1981 film Premabhisekham.

Plot
Dharma Raju and his son Nagaraju run a smuggling and illegal transport racket of forest produce. Ramu opposes and raises the villagers to fight against him. Padma who is the daughter of forest officer loves him. One tribal lady Chilakamma also loves Ramu as a brother. Dharma Raju takes the help of one Jaggu to send Ramu away from the forest. The second half of the film reveals that Ramu is, in fact, a forest officer in a secret mission to investigate the case of forest affairs. The story finally leads to the arrest of all criminals.

Cast
N. T. Rama Rao as Ramu
Jaya Prada as Padma
Jayasudha as Chilakamma
Nagabhushanam as Dharmaraju
Satyanarayana as Nagaraju
Gummadi as Raja Shekaram
Jaggayya
Raja Babu as Bheemanna
Sridhar as Jaggu
Mada
Pandari Bai
Rama Prabha
Kavitha
Baby Rohini as Gowri

Soundtrack

Music composed by K. V. Mahadevan. Lyrics were written by Veturi.

Production

Development 
The grand success of Rajkumar's 1972 Kannada film Gandhada Gudi made with a forest backdrop prompted NTR to work on a script and dialogues based on a forest backdrop. Producer Suryanarayana said, "After a disastrous Prema Bandham, we planned Adavi Ramudu with Ramarao gaaru, and a two-films old Raghavendra Rao. His much-celebrated Jyothi didn't start by that time. But Ramarao gaaru knew KRR well enough from the time Raghavendra Rao assisted 'pouraaNika brahma' Kamalakara Kameswara Rao in Pandava Vanavasamu and agreed readily to do the film. After completing the shooting, he just complemented us saying that shooting of this film shall remain as one of the best memories in his life. The film was such a big success that people of that generation speak volumes of it and feel nostalgic even today, wherever I go. I am really happy that I made such a film with my cousin Satyanarayana".

Satya Chitra banner (of producers Nekkanti Veera Venkata Satyanarayana and Arumilli Suryanarayana) started their first film with Sobhan Babu's Tahsildar Gaari Ammaayi (12 November 1971), which was based on a serial by Kavilipati Vijayalakshmi in Andhra Prabha titled Vidhi Vinyaasaalu. The film was directed by K.S. Prakasha Rao, father of K. Raghavendra Rao; Raghavendra Rao was an assistant director for that film. The film was one of the big hits in Sobhan Babu's career in which he played a dual role. After that film, they made Prema Bandham (12 March 1976 – the same day as NTR's Aaradhana) with Sobhan Babu and Vanisree under the direction of K. Viswanath. but it was declared a flop as it could not sustain the craze of Aaradhana.

Casting 
When they were planning their next film, they approached Raghavendra Rao to work for them, whom they already knew as an assistant director as he just started taking up direction independently. NTR had already given them dates in September 1976. At that time, Rajkumar's movie Gandhada Gudi, made with a forest backdrop, went on to be a blockbuster hit in Karnataka. This prompted the team to suggest that Jandhyala should work on the script and dialogues based on a forest backdrop.

Jayasudha, who already worked with K. Raghavendra Rao for his film Raja, was chosen for an important role. Jayaprada was a new sensation in Telugu film industry and a budding artist at that time with her Sirisirimuvva being a super hit. Thus, she was taken for the heroine role. Sridhar was approached to do an important role opposite Jayasudha. Jayasudha was not aware that she was doing the second role until the last minute, but since she had already agreed to do the film, she just went ahead keeping faith in Raghavendra Rao. She got a lot of letters after the film's release from her fans requesting her to not do a second lead role again in any of her future films, though she had a good role in the film (People were not aware that she signed this film before she did Jyothi, as Jyothi hit the screens earlier than Adavi Ramudu and brought Jayasudha a good name.).

Though he had given the dates for Adavi Ramudu, NTR was doing Daana Veera Soora Karna at the same time, which he planned to complete before January in order for it to be ready for Sankranthi release. He called the producers Satyanarayana and Suryanarayana to inform them that he'd give bulk dates once he completed the shooting of Daana Veera Soora Karna.

Filming 

Except for the opening shot, the entire film's filming was done in Madumalai forest. The opening shot was done in Madras in a studio on 9 January 1977. Adavi Ramudu was the first film for which NTR had given dates for more than a month (35 days) out of Madras. It is NTR's first color film shot in Cinemascope. This was also the first film that used a Cinemascope lens imported from Japan by Prasad Labs (Madras). Earlier Cinemascope films Alluri Seetharamaraju and Kurukshetram were done with a lens brought from Mumbai.  Cameraman Vincent first worked with NTR much earlier, for the film Sontha Ooru produced by Sree Ghantasala, and this was the second film for him with NTR after a long time.

There were only three Government Guesthouses in Madumalai forest, and the producers could not accommodate the 300 plus cast and crew in that dense forest. So the producers took carpenters, molders, painters, etc. to the forest, worked for fifty days to build new guesthouses and took special permission for electricity in the middle of the forest. The nearest town or airport was 250 km away from the forest, and for every small thing, they had to go all the way to Mysore. Thus, they used to get all of a day's needs each morning from Mysore.

Jayasudha recollects two accidents during this shooting: one was while doing a scene where she and Jaya Prada were sitting on elephants. Junior artistes were practising a Dappu scene right then, and the elephants got panicked by the noise and threw down both the lead ladies with their trunks. Luckily, they escaped with minor injuries. Another one was a chase scene where she and Jaya Prada were chased by villains while they were trying to escape on a horse cart. The cart's axle broke and both of them were injured and were forced to rest for a couple of days.

Release
The film was released on 28 April 1977 to positive reviews.

Reception 
The film collected  in its 50 days theatrical run and  within 67 days which was a then record later broken by NTR's own Vetagaadu in 1979. The film was the first Telugu film to collect Rs. 3 crores (Rs. 30 million). It had a 100-day run in 32 centres, a 175-day run in 16 centres, and a 200-day run in 8 centres. The film had a run for 302 days in Apsara theatre, Vijayawada. The film had a run for 365 days in four centers. The film still holds the record for the longest run with regular shows in Secunderabad (161 days). In Hyderabad, the film was housefull for 47 days in Andhra Pradesh's then biggest film hall, Venkatesa 70 mm where it collected 1.3 million, an amount twice the figure of the previous single theatre record collection. The film had such a euphoria among the people that it created a new unbroken record by completing 100 days theatrical run in two "shift" theatres while in Kanaka Mahal theatre at Nellore where it was very difficult for a film to get four screenings a day, Adavi Ramudu was screened for five times a day until its 102nd day and held this record for almost nine years until broken by NTR's son, Nandamuri Balakrishna's Seetharama Kalyanam.

Legacy 
The film re-brought NTR in the league of top heroes of the Telugu film Industry The success of the film made K. Raghavendra Rao an established director in Telugu cinema. The title of the film was used for a 2004 Prabhas starrer movie.

Awards
 Filmfare Award for Best Film - Telugu - N.V.V. Satyanarayana (1977)
 Nandi Award for Best Cinematographer - A. Vincent (1977)

Notes

References

External links

1977 films
Films directed by K. Raghavendra Rao
Films scored by K. V. Mahadevan
Films set in forests
1970s Telugu-language films